Groezrock was an annual music festival that took place in Meerhout, Belgium. It started as a small rock and pop festival with one stage and a few hundred people attending, but evolved into a large punk rock/hardcore punk festival, with attendances exceeding 30,000.

The festival had one stage until 2003, when it added a second stage called Back-to-Basics, which was reserved for more hardcore-oriented bands. Since 2006 the festival has taken place over multiple days, and grew to three stages in 2009 and four stages in 2012.

It was announced in October 2017 that the 2018 edition of Groezrock would not be taking place in the Spring, and would instead be an indoor festival in the autumn. The festival have stated that they will be "back in full force" with the usual format in 2019.

1992 
1992: Grandma's Toy, Buckle Juice, Dinky Toys, Pitti Polak

1993 
1993: Give Buzze, The Establishment, Ashbury Faith, The Scabs

1994 
1994: One Hes, Inna Nip, Rusk, Groggy's Crawl, Thermos, Burma Shave, Metal Molly, Jack of Hearts, Soapstone, B.J. Scott

1995 
1995: Oxid, Cesspool, Quip, Dildo Warheads, Mutilated, Deeper, Brotherhood Foundation, L.A. Doors

1996 
1996: Small Yellow Fish, Protest, Underdog!?, Cooper, Def Real, The Romans, Brotherhood Foundation, Deviate

1997 
1997 (26 April): Ryker's, Heideroosjes, Brotherhood Foundation, Gwyllions, Instructions For Use, Igor's Record Shop, Cornflames, Flee Bag

1998 
1998 (25 April): Millencolin, Good Riddance, |Intensity, AFI, Hard Resistance, Undeclinable Ambuscade, Pancake, Instructions For Use, Sixpack Joe, Cooperate, Plan 9

1999 
1999 (24 April): No Fun at All, Ten Foot Pole, 59 Times The Pain, Good Riddance, 88 Fingers Louie, Buck Wild, Bombshell Rocks, Void Section, Janez Detd., 2 Late, Access Denied, Nevergreen, PN

2000 
2000 (29 April): No Fun at All, Heideroosjes, Down By Law, Liberator, Bouncing Souls, Within Reach, Facedown, Vision, 5 Days Off, I Against I, Skin Of Tears, Apeshit, Delate, Figure It Out

2001 
2001 (28 April): Square One, Buckle Up, Powerhouse, Deviates, Venerea, Burning Heads, Adhesive, Stoned, Randy, Undeclinable, 59 Times the Pain, Snuff, SNFU, Ignite, Voodoo Glow Skulls

2002 
2002 (27 April): Bad Religion, Sick of It All, Guttermouth, Down By Law, Satanic Surfers, Rise Against, Undeclinable Ambuscade (surprise act), Circle, .Calibre, Kill Your Idols, Horace Pinker, Flatcat

2003 
2003 (26 April):

Main: Dropkick Murphys, Biohazard, Glassjaw, Ten Foot Pole, Hot Water Music, dredg, Flogging Molly, Gameface, Randy, The Shandon, Face Tomorrow, Skool's Out

B2B: Severance, Between The Lines, Support, Terror, Caliban, Give Up the Ghost, Stairland, Poison the Well

2004 
2004 (24 April):

Main: Millencolin, Sick of It All, Heideroosjes, Mad Caddies, Madball, Pulley, Strung Out, Ten Foot Pole, Midtown, The Almighty Trigger Happy, Travoltas, Belvedere, Beatsteaks

B2B: E.Town Concrete, Stretch Arm Strong, Liar, The Bronx, The Promise, Cornflames, Rise and Fall, Champion

2005 
2005 (Saturday 30 April)

2006 
2006 ( 28 and 29 April)

Friday 28 April

Saturday 29 April

2007 
( 27 and 28 April)

Friday 27 April

Saturday 28 April

2008 
( 9 and 10 May)

Friday 9 May

Saturday 10 May

2009 
( 17 and 18 April)

Friday 17 April

Saturday 18 April

2010 
( 23 and 24 April):

Friday 23 April

Saturday 24 April

2011 
22 and 23 April

Friday 22 April

Saturday 23 April

2012 
28 and 29 April

Saturday 28 April

Sunday 29 April

2013 
27 and 28 April

Saturday 27 April

Sunday 28 April

2014 
 2 and 3 May

Friday 2 May

Saturday 3 May

2015 
 1 and 2 May

Friday 1 May

Saturday 2 May

2016 
 29 and 30 April

Friday 29 April

Saturday 30 April

2017 
 29 and 30 April

Saturday 29 April

Sunday 30 April

References

External links
Official site

Rock festivals in Belgium
Spring (season) events in Belgium